Kimberly Howard is the trust manager for the Oregon Cultural Trust. She has served in that position since April 2009. She completed her undergraduate education at Pacific Union College in Angwin, California  and her Master of Fine Arts in acting at Columbia University in New York City.

References

Living people
Pacific Union College alumni
Year of birth missing (living people)